James St. Clair Heintz (born March 25, 1968) is an American economist. He is the Andrew Glyn Professor of Economics at the University of Massachusetts, Amherst. He is an expert on economic policy, job creation, labor standards, international trade, clean energy and human rights. He has also served as an expert to the International Labour Organization, the United Nations Development Program (UNDP), the United Nations Research Institute for Social Development well as the Economic Commission for Africa. His research has particularly focused on the relationship between economic policy and economic and social rights.

He earned as master's degree at the University of Minnesota and a Ph.D. in economics at the University of Massachusetts.

References

American economists
People from Lexington, Kentucky
1968 births
Living people